Trippy is a travel website.

Trippy may also refer to:
 Tripping (psychedelics), a drug-induced altered state of consciousness
 Trippy, a character in the film Mr. Skeffington
 "Trippy", a song from Lil Wayne's 2013 album I Am Not a Human Being II
 Trippy Turtle (born Peder Losnegård, 1992), Norwegian musician also known as Lido
 Charles Trippy (born 1984), American musician and internet personality
 Chaz Trippy, percussionist in the Gregg Allman Band

See also
 TRP.P a Canadian R&B duo from Toronto, Canada
 Trippi (disambiguation)
 Trippie Redd (born 1999), American rapper
 Tripy Makonda (born 1990), French footballer